James William Kirkaldy (8 November 1885–unknown) was a Scottish footballer who played in the Football League for Newcastle United.

References

1885 births
Scottish footballers
English Football League players
Association football defenders
Newcastle United F.C. players
Kilmarnock F.C. players
Huddersfield Town A.F.C. players
Year of death missing